Peter Francis Johnson (born 27 August 1943) was an Australian politician. Born in Sydney, he was a wholesaler and exporter before entering politics. In 1975, he was elected to the Australian House of Representatives as the Liberal member for Brisbane, defeating Labor MP Manfred Cross amid the massive Coalition landslide that year.  Johnson was behind in initial counting, but benefited from the National Country Party opting to contest seats outside its traditional rural heartland; he won on the third count when the National Country candidate's preferences flowed overwhelmingly to him.  A redistribution ahead of the 1977 election technically made Brisbane a safe Liberal seat, but Johnson narrowly saw off a spirited challenge from Cross that year.  Cross defeated him in a subsequent election, in 1980.
Johnson went on to become a philosopher writing numerous books on R. G. Collingwood and virtue ethics.

References

Liberal Party of Australia members of the Parliament of Australia
Members of the Australian House of Representatives for Brisbane
Members of the Australian House of Representatives
1943 births
Living people
20th-century Australian politicians